The Room is a 2003 American romantic drama film.

The Room may also refer to:

Film and television 
 The Room (2019 film), a French horror film 
 "The Room", an episode of Captain Power and the Soldiers of the Future
 "The Room", an episode of Life with Derek
 "The Room", an episode of Six Feet Under

Gaming
 The Room (video game), a 2012 puzzle game
 The Room Two, a 2013 sequel
 The Room Three, a 2015 second sequel
 The Room: Old Sins, the 2018 fourth game in the series
 The Room VR: A Dark Matter, the 2020 virtual reality spinoff sequel
 The Room Tribute or The Room: The Game, a 2010 adventure game based on the 2003 film
 Silent Hill 4: The Room (2004)

Literature
 The Room (novel), a 1971 novel by Hubert Selby Jr.
 The Room (play), a 1957 play by Harold Pinter

Music
 The Room (band), a 1980s new wave band from Liverpool
 The Room (album), a 2000 album by Harold Budd
 The Room (EP), a 2005 EP by Zoé
 "The Room" (song), a 2010 song by the Twilight Sad
 "The Room (Brainwash)", a 1981 song by Rick Wakeman from 1984

Other uses
 The Room (store), a section in some Hudson's Bay department stores

See also

 Room (disambiguation)
 The Rooms, a cultural facility in St. John's, Canada
 Basements, a TV film by Robert Altman featuring Pinter's play
 The Lost Room, a 2006 science fiction mini-series